Gotthard is the first studio album by the hard rock band Gotthard. It was released in 1992. The album peaked at #5 on the Swiss charts, and was certified as Platinum for exceeding 30,000 sales. The album art appears to be based on the Shroud of Turin.

The original version of "Get Down" first appeared on Chris von Rohr's 1987 solo album, Hammer & Tongue, re-issued in 1993 as The Good, The Bad and The Dog.

Track listing
All songs written by Steve Lee/Leo Leoni except where noted.

 "Standing In the Light" – 3:54
 "Downtown" – 3:06
 "Firedance" – 6:12 (Steve Lee/Leo Leoni/Chris von Rohr)
 "Hush" – 4:04 (Joe South)
 "Mean Street Rocket" – 3:53 (Steve Lee/Leo Leoni/Chris von Rohr)
 "Get Down" – 3:22 (Chris von Rohr/Many Maurer)
 "Take Me" – 3:43
 "Angel" – 5:31
 "Lonely Heartache" – 3:45
 "Hunter" – 4:15
 "All I Care For" – 3:10
 ""That's It"" (Instrumental) – 1:16 (Leo Leoni/Hena Habegger)

Personnel
Steve Lee – vocals,
Leo Leoni – guitars and vocals
Marc Lynn – bass guitar
Hena Habegger - drums

Guests:
Vivian Campbell –  lead guitar (Tracks 3 & 6)
Pat Regan – keyboards
Neil Otupacca – keyboards

Production
Mixing – Pat Regan
Assistant Mixing – Chris von Rohr and Peavy Tanner

Charts

Weekly charts

Year-end charts

References

External links
Heavy Harmonies page

Gotthard (band) albums
1992 debut albums